Hugh Proctor Thompson (born July 7, 1943) is the former Chief Justice of the Georgia Supreme Court. He was originally appointed to the Supreme Court by Governor Zell Miller on March 1, 1994. Thompson is a graduate of the Walter F. George School of Law of Mercer University. Thompson was born in Macon, Georgia.

References

Living people
Chief Justices of the Supreme Court of Georgia (U.S. state)
Emory University alumni
Georgia (U.S. state) lawyers
Mercer University alumni
Oglethorpe University alumni
Justices of the Supreme Court of Georgia (U.S. state)
1943 births